The flag of the Commonwealth of Massachusetts is the flag of Massachusetts. It has been represented by official but limited-purpose flags since 1676, though until 1908 it had no state flag per se to represent its government.  A variant of the white flag with blue seal was carried by each of the Massachusetts volunteer regiments during the American Civil War alongside the National Colors. An exception were the two "Irish regiments" (the 9th and 28th Volunteers), each of which was permitted to carry an alternative green flag with a harp symbol. 

The state currently has three official flags:  a state flag, a governor's flag, and a "naval and maritime flag" (despite it no longer having its own navy). With Florida and Minnesota, it is one of only three state flags to prominently feature a Native American in its heraldry. In 2001, a survey conducted by the North American Vexillological Association (NAVA) placed Massachusetts's state flag 38th in design quality out of 72 flags (U.S. state, U.S. territorial and Canadian provincial).

In early 2021, then-Governor Charlie Baker signed a bill to change the state flag and seal. As of 2022, the redesign was not complete and the commission asked to extend the deadline to 2023.

State flag 

The flag of the Commonwealth of Massachusetts displays, on both sides, the state coat of arms on a white field. The shield is meant to depict an Algonquian Native American with bow and arrow; the arrow is pointed downward, signifying peace. However, the face of the figure is modelled on a photo of Ojibwe chief Thomas Little Shell. A white star with five points appears next to the figure's head, signifying Massachusetts as a U.S. state. A blue ribbon surrounds the shield, bearing the state motto Ense Petit Placidam, Sub Libertate Quietem ("By the Sword We Seek Peace, But Peace Only Under Liberty"). 

Above the shield is the state military crest: the bent arm holding a broadsword aloft.  The sword has its blade up, to remind that it was through the American Revolution that liberty was won. The sword itself is a copy of one belonging to Myles Standish and signifies the philosophy that one would rather lose their right arm than live under tyranny.

The state flag was officially adopted in 1907, but had been used unofficially since the American Revolutionary War as the ensign of the Massachusetts State Navy. In 1971, the earlier pine tree was replaced by the current design.

Attempts to change the flag
On January 11, 2021, Governor Charlie Baker signed a bill establishing a commission to change the state flag and seal by October 1, 2021 that will "faithfully reflect and embody the historic and contemporary commitments of the Commonwealth to peace, justice, liberty and equality and to spreading the opportunities and advantages of education." The bill was previously approved by the Massachusetts Senate on July 28, 2020. The Special Commission on Massachusetts Flag and Seal (Special Commission to Investigate the Features of the Official Seal and Motto of the Commonwealth) first met in July 2021. In April 2022 the Commission voted to ask the state legislature to extend the deadline for completion of the Commission's work to 31 March 2023.
In May 2022, the Commission recommended changing the seal, motto, and flag.

Historical and related flags

Naval and maritime flag 
In April 1776, the Massachusetts State Navy adopted, as its flag (naval ensign), a white field charged with a green pine tree and the motto "An Appeal to Heaven." In 1971 the motto was removed, and the flag was designated "the naval and maritime flag of the Commonwealth".

Massachusetts is one of only three states with its own maritime ensign. The first is Maine, which was part of Massachusetts until 1820. The second is South Carolina, which activated her navy twice: first during the American Revolutionary War and again during the American Civil War.

See also 

 Flags of the Governors of the U.S. States
 Commonwealth of Massachusetts
 Symbols of the Commonwealth of Massachusetts
 Coat of arms of the Commonwealth of Massachusetts
 Great Seal of the Commonwealth of Massachusetts
 Flag of New England
 Pine Tree Flag

References

External links 
 
 

Symbols of Massachusetts
Massachusetts
Massachusetts
Massachusetts
Political controversies in the United States
Massachusetts
Native American-related controversies